Next Generation Internet may refer to:

China Next Generation Internet (CNGI), a five-year plan initiated by the Chinese government
 Future Internet, a general term for research projects on how the Internet might evolve
Next Generation Internet Program (NGI), a United States Government project
 Next Generation Internet (NGI), see European Grid Infrastructure

See also 
 ICANN, Internet Corporation for Assigned Names and Numbers
 Internet Assigned Numbers Authority (IANA)
 Next generation network, similar concept for telecommunications networks